P. viticola may refer to:
 Phomopsis viticola, the agent of the phomopsis leaf, also called cane spot or fruit rot disease
 Plasmopara viticola, the agent of the downy mildew in grape